Fernand Bothy (born 23 March 1926) is a Belgian former boxer. He competed in the men's heavyweight event at the 1948 Summer Olympics.

References

1926 births
Living people
Belgian male boxers
Olympic boxers of Belgium
Boxers at the 1948 Summer Olympics
Sportspeople from Namur (province)
Heavyweight boxers